Marinka or Maryinka is a city located in Pokrovsk Raion, Donetsk Oblast, Ukraine. Population:  10,722 (2001).

During the 2022 Russian invasion of Ukraine, the city was largely destroyed as a result of ongoing fighting, with no civilians living in the town since November 2022.

Early history 
Sometime after the 1775 liquidation of Zaporizhian Sich, lands of Kalmius Palatine were initially passed to the Greek re-settlers. However, according to the general plan of the Aleksandrovsk county of the 1830s, the area of Maryinka and surrounding villages was not colonized. After the final demarcation of the government land, in the 1840s, on territory not colonized by Greeks, former Ukrainian Cossacks and state peasants (see state serf) from various counties of Poltava Governorate and Kharkov Governorate (Little Russia). moved there. After the partition of Poland, at the end of 18th century here were also exiled Polish people from the Kiev and Podolia governorates who also were under a special supervision by the local administration. Unlike the state peasants who used a community land, the exiled Poles were considered as landowners ("odnodvortsy").

By 1859 there were 1,318 people. As a state village, Marinka belonged to the fourth stan of Aleksandrovsk county, Yekaterinoslav Governorate. The village administration consisted of a village senior (head of village), a tax collector, a secretary, and a supervisor.

The city was under German occupation between 1941 and 1943. Having been locked up in the police station, the Jews of the city (and the surrounding villages) were killed in a mass execution by an Einsatzgruppe. The site of the massacre is located in a pit near the cemetery.

Russo-Ukrainian War

Starting in mid-April 2014 Russian-backed paramilitaries captured several towns in Donetsk Oblast, including Marinka. On 5 August 2014, Ukrainian forces regained control of Marinka. Ukrainian forces involved in the recapture included the Azov Battalion, whose flag flew in the city in early August. In this operation one volunteer fighter was killed (a member of Azov, a Russian citizen) and 14 wounded (9 in an explosion of a Ukrainian tank due to an anti-tank mine).

The city was shelled on a regular basis, with Ukrainian troops returning fire. Pro-Russian fighters accused Ukrainian troops of using their positions in Marinka to shell militant-controlled Donetsk - a claim denied by the Ukrainian military.

Three people died close to a checkpoint on 10 February 2016 when a minibus while bypassing a queue drove roadside and hit a land mine. The driver had ignored land mine warning signs.

According to Ukrainian MP Iryna Herashchenko, in September 2016 5,000 people lived in Marinka.

Battle of Marinka

On 3 June 2015, fresh violence returned to the area as pro-Russian combatants launched an offensive on the city involving 1,000 fighters, tanks and heavy artillery. They stated they only engaged in defence measures after an assault by the Ukrainian army. By then the town had already been devastated by months of heavy fighting.

According to the BBC, the 3 June 2015 fighting was the heaviest of the war in Donbas since the so-called Minsk II ceasefire was signed on 11 February 2015. In the early evening of 3 June 2015, Donetsk People's Republic's Defence Minister Vladimir Kononov and the Ukrainian military confirmed to the OSCE that Marinka was under Ukrainian control. According to OSCE figures, 28 people, including 9 civilians, were killed in Marinka on 3 June 2015.

2022 Russian invasion of Ukraine 

On 17 March 2022, refreshed battles for Marinka began following the 2022 Russian invasion of Ukraine. In the process, much of the city was destroyed, with only a few residents remaining , according to Der Spiegel. One reporter likened Marinka in January 2023 to an "urban hellscape". During the battle, buildings were purposefully destroyed in order to prevent them from being used as cover.

Gallery

References

External links
 Marinka in the Encyclopedia of Ukraine
 Christopher Miller, Guns Of August: Fears Of Full-Scale War Return As Casualties Mount In Ukraine, Radio Free Europe/Radio Liberty, 9 August 2016

Cities in Donetsk Oblast
Yekaterinoslav Governorate
Cities of district significance in Ukraine
Populated places established in the Russian Empire
Holocaust locations in Ukraine
Pokrovsk Raion
Buildings and structures destroyed during the 2022 Russian invasion of Ukraine
Destroyed cities